Jai Angsuthasawit (born 16 February 1995) is an Australian-Thai track cyclist, who specializes in sprinting events. He won the overall title in the keirin at the 2019–20 UCI Track Cycling World Cup as well as the keirin at the 2018 Asian Games.

References

1995 births
Living people
Australian track cyclists
Australian male cyclists
Jai Angsuthasawit
Jai Angsuthasawit
Cyclists from Adelaide
Asian Games medalists in cycling
Jai Angsuthasawit
Cyclists at the 2018 Asian Games
Medalists at the 2018 Asian Games